The 2018 BeNe Ladies Tour was the fifth edition of the BeNe Ladies Tour, a women's cycling stage race in the Netherlands. It is rated by the UCI as a category 2.1 race.

Stages

Classification leadership

See also

 2018 in women's road cycling

References

BeNe Ladies Tour
BeNe Ladies Tour